Palaeoses is a genus of moths of the family Palaeosetidae. It consists of only one species, Palaeoses scholastica, which is only known from Queensland.

References

Hepialoidea
Monotypic moth genera
Taxa named by Alfred Jefferis Turner
Exoporia genera
Moths of Australia